Aargau Southern Railway is a former railway company in Switzerland. Between 1873 and 1882, the Schweizerische Centralbahn (SCB) and the Schweizerische Nordostbahn (NOB) jointly built a connecting line to the Gotthardbahn. The line was operated by the SCB and ran from Rupperswil to Immensee. Branch lines ran from Wohlen to Bremgarten and from Hendschiken to Brugg.

History
The routes were opened in this order:
 23 June 1874: Rupperswil - Lenzburg - Hendschiken - Wohlen
 1 June 1875: Wohlen - Muri
 1 September 1876: Wohlen - Bremgarten West
 1 December 1881: Muri - Immensee
 1 June 1882: Hendschiken - Brugg

In 1902, the Aargauische Südbahn (together with the SCB and NOB) became part of the Swiss Federal Railways.

Lines

Rupperswil–Immensee

Brugg–Hendschiken

Wohlen–Bremgarten West

Notes

References
 

Defunct railway companies of Switzerland
1874 establishments in Switzerland
1902 disestablishments in Switzerland